Horace David Jeanes is an English former rugby union and World Cup winning professional rugby league footballer who played in the 1960s and 1970s.

Background
David Jeanes was born in Skipton, West Riding of Yorkshire, England.

Rugby Union career
Keighley Grammar School 1959/61 – 1st team – second row
Keighley RUFC 1960–1966 - Yorkshire Colts 1962
Wakefield RFC 1966/67 – prop
Baildon RU 1974/78 and 1979 - 2007 player, then coach/assistant

Rugby League career
Silsden U19 RL team – 1 game in 1961 final – second row
Wakefield Trinity 1967–1972 – played 168 games – prop
 1968 won championship final
 lost 'watersplash' final at Wembley (D. Fox missed goal)
 1971 played 3 times for Yorkshire RL
 Played 3 times for Great Britain (once against France, twice against New Zealand)
 Captained Wakefield against Halifax in No 6 final  which Wakefield lost
 1972 played for Great Britain twice against France
 1972 played for Yorks RL once
Leeds 1972/74 - prop
 1972 played for GB in World Cup (twice against Australia; including final, and once against New Zealand)
 1973 won Players No 6 final
 1973 won Yorkshire County Cup
 1974 won Yorks Cup
Amateur Rugby League
 1975 Shaw Lane - won division, cup runners up (player coach)
 1976/77 Underbank - played important games
Huddersfield 1977/1979
 part of promotion winning team, player of the season

International honours
David Jeanes played right-, i.e. number 10, in Great Britain's 10-10 draw with Australia in the 1972 Rugby League World Cup Final at Stade de Gerland, Lyon on 11 November 1972. Great Britain were awarded the Rugby League World Cup by virtue of a better position in the final qualification league table.

County honours
David Jeanes won cap(s) for Yorkshire while at Wakefield Trinity.

Championship final appearances
David Jeanes played  left-, number 8, and scored a try in Wakefield Trinity's 17-10 victory over Hull Kingston Rovers in the Championship Final during the 1967–68 season at Headingley Rugby Stadium, Leeds on  Saturday 4 May 1968.

Challenge Cup Final appearances
David Jeanes played  left-, number 8, in Wakefield Trinity's 10-11 defeat by Leeds in the 1967–68 Challenge Cup "Watersplash" Final during the 1967–68 season at Wembley Stadium, London on Saturday 11 May 1968, in front of a crowd of 87,100.

County Cup Final appearances
David Jeanes played  left-, i.e. number 8, in Leeds 7-2 victory over Wakefield Trinity in the 1973–74 Yorkshire County Cup Final during the 1973–74 season at Headingley Rugby Stadium, Leeds on Saturday 20 October 1973.

Player's No.6 Trophy Final appearances
David Jeanes played  left-, i.e. number 8, and was captain in Wakefield Trinity's 11-22 defeat by Halifax in the 1971–72 Player's No.6 Trophy Final during the 1971–72 season at Odsal Stadium, Bradford on Saturday 22 January 1972, and played right-, i.e. number 10, in Leeds' 12-7 victory over Salford in the 1972–73 Player's No.6 Trophy Final during the 1972–73 season at Fartown Ground, Huddersfield on Saturday 24 March 1973.

References

External links
!Great Britain Statistics at englandrl.co.uk (statistics currently missing due to not having appeared for both Great Britain, and England)
Statistics at rugbyleagueproject.org
Ex-rugby player reflects on rare World Cup victory
Map of place of Birth: Greatwood Ave, Skipton-on-Swale
When Great Britain won the World Cup
Tracking down the heroes of 1972
Rugby Cup Final 1968

1943 births
Living people
English rugby league players
English rugby union players
Great Britain national rugby league team players
Huddersfield Giants players
Leeds Rhinos players
People from Skipton
Rugby league players from Yorkshire
Rugby league props
Rugby union props
Wakefield RFC players
Wakefield Trinity captains
Wakefield Trinity players
Yorkshire rugby league team players